Waha Al-Raheb (born 1960) is a Syrian-Egyptian actress and filmmaker. She wrote and directed Dreamy Visions (2003), the first Syrian feature film by a woman.

Life
Waha Al-Raheb was born to Syrian parents on April 27, 1960 in Cairo. The daughter of a diplomat, Al-Raheb was educated internationally. She studied at the Academy of Fine Arts in Damascus before studying film at Paris 8 University, with a thesis on the role of women in Syrian cinema from 1963 to 1986.

Novelist Hani al-Rahib (1939 – 2000) was her paternal uncle.

Filmography

As director (مخرج) 
 رؤى حلمة (Ruaa Halema, Dreamy Visions), 2003.

References

External links
 Waha Al Raheb

1960 births
Living people
20th-century Syrian actresses
Syrian film directors
Actresses from Cairo
Syrian women film directors